Altoona, a variant of "Altona", may refer to:

Places
Altoona, Alabama
Altoona, Florida
Altoona, Iowa
Altoona, Kansas
Altoona, Ohio
Altoona, Pennsylvania
Altoona, Washington
Altoona, Wisconsin

Biology
Altoona, a synonym of the moth genus Peoria (moth)

See also
Altona (disambiguation)
Altuna (disambiguation)